Sinningia araneosa is a flowering plant in the family Gesneriaceae. It was described in 1857 and not found afterwards, until it was rediscovered in the 1990s in the state of São Paulo, Brazil.

References

araneosa
Flora of Brazil